Galactica (formerly known as Air) is a flying roller coaster located in the Forbidden Valley area of Alton Towers amusement park in Staffordshire, England and is the first flying coaster manufactured by Bolliger & Mabillard. Guests ride in a prone position and experience the feeling of flight by "flying" close to the ground, under footpaths, and narrowly past trees and rocks.

The roller coaster originally opened as Air on 16 March 2002. Following the close of the 2015 season, the ride underwent refurbishment and reopened as Galactica on 24 March 2016.

History

Air (2002–2015) 
Alton Towers conceived the concept of a flying roller coaster in 1990, twelve years before Air eventually opened. Following the opening of Nemesis in 1994, a flying coaster was planned by the park to open in 1998, but was delayed due to technological limitations. During its development, Alton Towers marketed the ride as Secret Weapon 5 (abbreviated to SW5), following the naming pattern established for previous major park developments. The ride was developed in part by ride designer John Wardley, the producer of many attractions at Alton Towers and other former Tussauds Group theme parks.

Construction of Air began in mid-2001. Later that year, Alton Towers initially advertised the new rollercoaster as a "next generation Aerial Inversion Ride"; subsequently revealing the name Air.

In early 2002, testing of Air began with special crash test dummies. At the time of opening, Air tied with Oblivion as the most expensive ride at Alton Towers, at a cost of £12 million. A£4.5 million marketing campaign for the ride included commercials based around the ride's slogan, "assume the position". Air officially opened to the public on 16 March 2002. On opening, Alton Towers entered into a five-year sponsorship agreement for the ride with Cadbury Heroes.

Galactica (2016–present) 
In June 2015, the park submitted a planning application to make modifications to the station building and retail space. This proposed adding a new photo opportunity into the queue, enclosing the station building with new walls, and constructing additional theming elements around the ride area. This was in addition to an earlier planning application to convert the existing ride shop into a restaurant. In October 2015, the first promotional material was posted on the Alton Towers website, advising guests to "prepare for a new flight" and to "watch this space".

On 12 January 2016, Alton Towers announced that Air would be re-themed as Galactica for the 2016 season and would include on-ride virtual reality headsets simulating a ride through the cosmos. The announcement was made at an event held at the Science Museum. Each seat on the roller coaster was initially fitted with a Samsung Gear VR headset and pouch. The virtual reality experience was optional, as guests could choose to ride without using the headsets. A promotional website was also released explaining more information about the ride and its new storyline. In late February 2016, the park announced that the official opening date would be 24 March 2016.

For the 2018 season, the virtual reality headsets were reduced to the back three rows of each train only, with guests choosing whether to use the VR or not when they entered the station.

On 17 March 2019, Alton Towers announced that the virtual reality headsets would be removed entirely due to guest feedback. Despite the removal of virtual reality, the ride has maintained its Galactica name and theme.

Characteristics

Statistics
Riders can experience a g-force of up to 3.5g whilst on the ride. One cycle of the ride lasts approximately one minute and forty seconds.

Trains
Galactica features a dual-platform loading station, permitting three trains to operate simultaneously. Each train has seven cars, with each car carrying four riders side-by-side in a single row. This configuration allows for up to 1500 riders per hour, although this was heavily reduced when VR was in operation.

Station and loading
Riders board a train sitting down, in a similar style to inverted roller coasters. Riders are restrained through a padded over-the-shoulder harness and a lap bar. At the ankles, two flaps hold the legs in position and close as the harness locks into place. After a train is fully locked and checked, riders are raised into the flying position and the train departs the station. From 2016 to 2018, riders had the option of wearing virtual reality headsets, which were attached to the restraints.

Ride layout

Galactica departs the station and rises a chain lift hill. The ride's first drop dips to the right, before rising back up and flying through the ride's centrepiece theming element, a portal, which links to the ride's space theme. Followed by this, riders are turned from the prone position onto their backs. The coaster then performs a large upward left turn before twisting again, returning riders to the prone position. After exiting from the lie-to-fly element, Galactica passes underneath a small ravine before pitching up, into a tight turn over the plaza area. A 360 degrees inline twist is followed up by a series of straight flying, and several turns and dips in the track. The train then comes to a stop on the brake run before returning to one of the ride's two stations.

Reception
The Tussauds Group, owners of Alton Towers in the early 2000s, claimed that Air contributed to the park's strong performance in 2002 and 2003.

In Amusement Todays annual Golden Ticket Awards, Air was ranked in the top 50 steel roller coasters numerous times following its opening. It peaked at position 24 in 2003, before dropping to position 34 in 2004 and 36 in 2005. In 2006, it tied for position 49 with another Bolliger & Mabillard flying coaster, Superman: Ultimate Flight. It would not appear in the top 50 again until 2015 when it peaked at 38.

References

External links

Alton Towers
Roller coasters in the United Kingdom
Roller coasters introduced in 2002
Flying roller coasters manufactured by Bolliger & Mabillard
Roller coasters operated by Merlin Entertainments
Steel roller coasters
Rides designed by John Wardley
2002 establishments in England